Brookville Historic District is a national historic district located at Brookville, Franklin County, Indiana.  The district encompasses 682 contributing buildings in the central business district and surrounding residential sections of Brookville.  It developed between about 1811 and 1913, and includes notable examples of Federal and Greek Revival style architecture.  Located in the district are the separately listed Franklin County Seminary and The Hermitage.  Other notable contributing buildings include the James Brown Ray House (1811-1820), Old State Bank (c. 1817), James N. Tyner House (c. 1818), Old Brick Meeting House (1810-1821), Franklin County Courthouse (1853-1859), St. Michael's Catholic Church (1857-1868, 1901), Howland-Farquahar-Goodwin House (1855), Valley House Hotel (1842), and the Presbyterian Church (1854-1855).

It was listed on the National Register of Historic Places in 1975.

References

Historic districts on the National Register of Historic Places in Indiana
Federal architecture in Indiana
Greek Revival architecture in Indiana
Historic districts in Franklin County, Indiana
National Register of Historic Places in Franklin County, Indiana